Pierre Suard, born November 9, 1934 in Lons-le-Saunier, France, is an engineer, French senior official, and director of national companies. He is an alumnus of École Polytechnique and École des Ponts ParisTech (ENPC).

Career
After studying at École Polytechnique and ENPC (Ponts-et-Chaussées), Suard began working at the Compagnie Générale d’Électricité (CGE) in 1973. He was named CEO of the subsidiary Les Câbles de Lyon (Lyon Cable), which moved from fifth place to first in international ranking during the three years of his tenure. In 1986, when CGE was privatized, he was named CEO of the group by prime minister Édouard Balladur. In 1991, CGE became Alcatel Alsthom, and in 1998 the company’s name was changed to Alcatel.

Suard presided over the development of the first digital telephone exchanges, as well as that of fiber optic cables, which were eventually bought by ITT. He transformed a French company that was known foremost for its close relationship with the government into an international industry with a global strategy. In 1993, Alcatel secured the contract for the high-speed train in Korea, became the world leader in cable and telecommunications, and began to invest in media outlets, controlling two of France’s most popular news magazines, Le Point and L'Express.

Legal Proceedings
On July 4, 1994, Jean-Marie d'Huy, investigating magistrate at the civil court in the city of Évry, indicted Pierre Suard for abuse of public assets after Suard, afraid of becoming a target for terrorists from Action Directe, had a construction subsidiary of the Alcatel group install security systems worth 3 million francs in his homes. On March 10, 1995, after being accused by Denis Gazeau, a former Alcatel executive who was fired for “incompetence,” the judge indicted Suard for concealing fraud and overcharging 674 million francs to France Télécom, his biggest client. Suard was placed under judicial review, under which he was forbidden to continue to work for the group, and he was obliged to leave his job in June. He was succeeded by Serge Tchuruk. Suard accused Tchuruk of having pushed him out of his job and unjustly using certain accounting methods to discredit his management of the company, and to show artificially improved results after Suard left. In any case, the judgment that forbade Suard to work for the group made the company immediately lose 40% of its value on the French stock exchange. The judgment therefore inflicted a loss on stockholders thousands of times larger than the 9 million francs he purportedly “stole” from the company.

On May 6, 1997, the Évry Criminal Court gave Pierre Suard a suspended three-year prison sentence and a fine of 2 million francs; at the time the average fine for this type of crime was around 80,000 francs. The sentence was reduced and in the final stage of this obstacle course, on November 4, 2009, the Versailles Court of Appeals ordered the rehabilitation of Pierre Suard.

Case dismissed on all charges
On June 4, 2006, the Évry Criminal Court dismissed the charge regarding overcharging France Télécom. After an appeal by MM° Jean-Denis Bredin and Eric Dezeuze, in March 2008 the case for abuse of public assets was also dismissed.

Publications
In February, 2002, Pierre Suard’s book, L'envol saboté d'Alcatel-Alsthom was published by France-Empire.
In October, 2009, his book En Toute Impunité: La scandaleuse destruction d’Alcatel Alsthom, was published by Société des Ecrivains.
The investigating magistrate’s actions are described in detail in these two books; it is up to readers to discern if these works are accusations or simply descriptions of the methods of certain judges. In any case, at the end of 2017, the books had not been contradicted either legally or publicly by Judge d’Huy.

External links
Pierre Suard official website

French electrical engineers
Living people
Alcatel-Lucent
Year of birth missing (living people)